Pakistan Gems and Jewellery Development Company (PGJDC) is a state-owned subsidiary of Pakistan Industrial Development Corporation and is based in Karachi, Pakistan.

Company performance
In October 2007, this government-owned company announced plans for development of a 10.8-acre manufacturing complex for gems and jewellery manufacturers in Korangi Creek Industrial Park area of Karachi. This modern industrial park would have gems labs, training centers, processing units and jewellery manufacturing units located in it.

In March 2010, Pakistan Gems and Jewellery Development Company organized two training courses to train workers in Lahore, Pakistan.

In June 2013, Pakistan's gems and jewellery exports had risen from approximately $47 million to $1.2 billion since the establishment of Pakistan Gems and Jewellery Development Company in 2006.

In January 2017, a company official said that Pakistan should export more of its value-added precious and semi-precious colored gemstones so the country can touch $1.5 billion future exports target annually in this sector. He said that Pakistan was currently exporting its 65 percent precious gemstones in raw shape at extremely cheap prices. He said that country's professionals and workforce need to improve their mining skills and their facilities for this value-addition.

See also 
 Pakistan Industrial Development Corporation (PIDC)
 Trade Development Authority of Pakistan (TDAP)
 Pakistan Small and Medium Enterprise Development Authority (SMEDA)

References

External links 
 Pakistan Gems and Jewellery Development Company - official website

Pakistani companies established in 2006
Jewellery companies of Pakistan
Government-owned companies of Pakistan
Companies based in Karachi
Pakistan federal departments and agencies